is a 1984 Japanese film in Nikkatsu Studios' "Roman Porno" period, directed by Hiroyuki Nasu.

Premise
Megu enrolls in an extracurricular girls' wrestling club, but things are not quite what she expected. She soon learns the club's training program includes humiliating sexual submission to the senior female wrestlers and that the club's finances are secured with the prostitution of the girls to the members of a nearby all-male wrestling club. Megu's life is further strained when a rival wrestler Shinobu (Kaoru Ada) shows interest in her new boyfriend. This tension erupts at a no-holds-barred wrestling match. Megu's strength is pushed to the limit but she has a secret weapon—superhuman strength whenever she inserts her tampon.

Cast
Natsuko Yamamoto as Megu Shinohara
Kaoru Oda as Shinobu Yokoyama
Ryoko Watanabe as Aya Matsumori
Makoto Yoshino as Junko Tateno
Kiriko Shimizu as Mami Shinohara
Mai Inoue as Mayumi Hori
Naomi Hagio as Akiko Yamakura
Rika Ishii as Kaori Ichinose
Miyuki Amano as Kyôko Shiraki
Michiru Beppu as Yoshiko Kawamoto
Hiroshi Fukami as Ukai
Tamaki Komiyama as Nakatsu
Sakae Matsuzawa as Naomi Yamashita
Chino Sato as Saeko Ikeshita
Katsumi Sawada as Kazuo Mashiro
Sanae Takada as Norie Toriyama
Hiroshi Takayama as Morishita
Tomoyuki Taura as Ryûma Yamada
Hitomi Yuri as Sumire Kôzuki
Yasuharu Ôkubo as Kurauchi

Production
Director Nasu shot "Beautiful Wrestler: Down for the Count" to fulfill contractual obligations with Nikkatsu before moving on to Toei.

Bibliography

External links

References

1984 films
1980s pornographic films
Films directed by Hiroyuki Nasu
1980s Japanese-language films
Nikkatsu films
Nikkatsu Roman Porno
Professional wrestling films
Sport wrestling films
1980s Japanese films